Duvauchelle Bay is a small town situated at the head of Akaroa Harbour on Banks Peninsula in New Zealand. State Highway 75 passes through the town. The Onawe Peninsula separates Duvauchelle bay from Barry's Bay.

Duvauchelle is now part of Christchurch City Council jurisdiction since the city's amalgamation with Banks Peninsula District in 2006. From 1910 until 1989, Duvauchelle was the seat of the Akaroa County Council.

History
The site of an ancient Māori pā or fortified settlement is at Oinako, where the Duvauchelle Hotel stands today. At Te Wharau creek, a taua or war party of Ngāti Awa warriors camped during the battles led by Te Rauparaha in 1831.

The name of the town and bay comes from the surname of two brothers Jules-Augustin and Louis-Benjamin Duvauchelle, who held land there from the Nanto-Bordelaise Company, at the time of the French settlement at Akaroa in the 1840s. In the following decade, land alongside Duvauchelle Bay was leased from the Canterbury Association by British settlers, including William Augustus Gordon, who was the brother of Charles George Gordon, the famous soldier and colonial administrator, known as "Gordon of Khartoum" after his death. The first freeholds were bought in 1857; economic activity was focused on timber extraction and sawing, mostly totara trees. Domestic pigs were grazed in the forest, who mingled with the feral pigs that were already present. As the tree cover was cleared, it was replaced with pasture. The first settler at the Head of the Bay, the location of the present town, was a Frenchman called Libeau, who arrived in 1841. Timber exploitation was also the main activity, as well as boat building. The sawn timber was all carried out of the bay by locally built vessels. A public house and a shop were built in the 1850s. A small building that served as both church and school was built by local people on a half-acre plot of land donated by Lord Lyttelton. The first permanent roads began to be constructed in the 1860s and 1879 saw the arrival of the County Council offices and the Post Office.

Both the Duvauchelle Hotel and the post office were badly damaged by the earthquakes that struck the region in 2010 and 2011. The oldest parts of the hotel were demolished after the earthquakes, the remaining parts of the building were reopened as a single-storey establishment in September 2013. The post office was demolished in late 2012.

Demographics
It is grouped with other settlements including French Farm, Wainui, Robinson's Bay and Takamatua as the statistical area of Akaroa Harbour#Demographics. 

Duvauchelle had a population of 180 at the 2018 New Zealand census, a decrease of 30 people (-14.3%) since the 2013 census, and an increase of 9 people (5.3%) since the 2006 census. There were 84 households. There were 90 males and 87 females, giving a sex ratio of 1.03 males per female. The median age was 63.3 years (compared with 37.4 years nationally), with 15 people (8.3%) aged under 15 years, 12 (6.7%) aged 15 to 29, 66 (36.7%) aged 30 to 64, and 84 (46.7%) aged 65 or older.

Ethnicities were 93.3% European/Pākehā, 3.3% Māori, 3.3% Pacific peoples, 1.7% Asian, and 5.0% other ethnicities (totals add to more than 100% since people could identify with multiple ethnicities).

Although some people objected to giving their religion, 45.0% had no religion, 46.7% were Christian and 1.7% had other religions.

Of those at least 15 years old, 39 (23.6%) people had a bachelor or higher degree, and 27 (16.4%) people had no formal qualifications. The median income was $28,900, compared with $31,800 nationally. The employment status of those at least 15 was that 60 (36.4%) people were employed full-time, 24 (14.5%) were part-time, and 0 (0.0%) were unemployed.

Education
Duvauchelle School is a contributing primary school catering for years 1 to 6.

References

Banks Peninsula
Suburbs of Christchurch
Populated places in Canterbury, New Zealand
French-New Zealand culture